BonBon-Land is a Danish amusement park located in Holme-Olstrup in the South of Zealand, about 100 km from Copenhagen. This, 34-acre park attracts about 450,000 each season.

History
The history of the theme park Bon Bon Land dates back to when the Danish sweets boiler Michael Spangsberg began to produce candies with names that children would find funny, like 'mågeklatter' (Seagull Droppings) 'hundeprutter' (Dog Farts) and 'tissebleer' (Pee Diapers).

The candies became popular early on, and children wanted to visit the factory in Holme Olstrup (a small Danish town in the countryside). However, the factory couldn’t offer visiting tours because of strict hygiene regulations, so Michael Spangsberg opened the Bonbon-Land theme park.

In 1992, the theme park opened with a mini candy factory, a cinema, a shop, and four small boats shaped like ducks located in a small pond. The park was a success with children, and many rides and attractions have been added over the years. Bonbon-Land is one of Denmark’s most popular children’s parks, despite its adult-oriented content and toilet humor. (In 2008 it was the eighth most popular tourist attraction in Denmark) In 2007, the Spanish-based entertainment company Parques Reunidos purchased the park.

Since its founding, BonBon-Land has aimed to offer activities for people of all ages. Today, Bonbon-Land has over 60 different attractions and offers numerous activities. Among the most popular rides in the park are 4 roller coasters and 2 water rides. There are also a number of playgrounds and a pirate track.

In 1998, BonBon-Land’s park covered an area of 85.000 m² (21 acres). When the Beaver Rafting course was finished in 1998, its area increased to more than 110.000 m² (27 acres). The park was expanded to its current size of 130.000 m² (32 acres) when the ’Vildsvinet’ ride was added in 2003.

The most expensive attractions are the Beaver Rafting course, with a price of 32 million DKK, 'Vildsvinet', with an estimated price of 25 million DKK, and 'Hankatten,' with a price of 20 million DKK. New amusements in 2010 are 'Svend Svingarm' and a new 4D cinema. In 2012, it was ranked as one of the weirdest parks by Time.

Roller coasters

Water rides
Beaver Rafting – river rapids ride that opened in 1998. This 6 passenger raft ride is on a scenic 560m long course. Intamin.
The Water Rat – log flume ride that opened in 1995. A 220m long ride that features 2 drops on the way. CB Design.

Other rides
The Albatross – disk that was opened in 2004; height limit 1,1m. Zamperla.
The Cobra Tower – drop tower that opened in 2001; height limit 1,2m. Fabbri.
The Crow Trees – hoist yourself up the tower that opened in 2006; height limit 1,2m. Premier Rides.
Dillen (Mania) – air swing ride that opened in 1999; height limit none / 1,25m alone. Huss.
4D Film – theatre opened in 2010, currently showing The Little Prince.
Hestorado – stationary 5D interactive laser shoot-out that opened in 2011; height limit 1,1m. Alterface.
Klaptorsken (The Cod) – swinging ship that opened in 2002; height limit 1,1m.
Mågeklatterne – Zierer Radlerbahn.
Sprutten – Zierer Dragon Boats.
Paradise – walkthrough Candy Store that opened in 1992.
Søløven (The Sea Lion) – dark boat ride that opened in 2005. CB Design.
Svend The Swinging Arm – a giant swing that opened in 2009; height limit 1,4m. Zamperla.
Skildpadden (The Tortoise) – wave swinger that opened in 1994. Zierer.
The Worm – roundabout ride.

Kiddie rides
The Dragon – Himalaya-style ride.
Fantasy World – walkthrough with fantasy-like scenes and kiddie play area that opened in 2009.
Hot Wheels – kids can operate cars, mini trucks, excavators (opened in 2006).
Hestepærerne – on track horse ride.
Play Areas – the park has a number of play areas with various activities for kids.
The Shrimp – dinghy ride.
Trampolines – trampolines.
Walk the Plank – challenge course.
The Wet Dolphin – water playground that opened in 2007.

Other
The park has Arcade Games, various Test-Your-Skill Games, and a Kiddie Show.

Picture gallery

References

External links

BonBon-Land's homepage

Amusement parks in Denmark
Tourist attractions in Region Zealand
1992 establishments in Denmark
Parques Reunidos
Amusement parks opened in 1992